Jon Dunwell is an American politician serving as a member of the Iowa House of Representatives from the 38th district. In October 2021, Dunwell was elected in a special election to succeed Wes Breckenridge. Dunwell's win on October 12, 2021, over Newton City Councilman Steve Mullan flipped the 29th Iowa House district seat to Republican from Democrat in the special election.

Background 
Prior to entering politics, Dunwell worked as a pastor in Orlando, Florida and Minnesota. He also worked as the vice president of two financial services firms. He later relocated to his wife's hometown of Newton, Iowa. Dunwell was elected to the Iowa House of Representatives in an October 2021 special election, succeeding Wes Breckenridge in the 29th district.

References 

Living people
Republican Party members of the Iowa House of Representatives
21st-century American politicians
Year of birth missing (living people)
People from Newton, Iowa